The Al-Fahd is an armoured fighting vehicle used by the Armed Forces of Saudi Arabia. It was the first armored fighting vehicle developed and built-in Saudi Arabia. The vehicle is produced by the Abdallah Al Faris Company for Heavy Industries, which is based in Dammam.

The Al Fahd is available in three configurations: The AF-40-8-1; an armoured personnel carrier (APC) or infantry fighting vehicle (IFV) variant, and the AF-40-8-2; an armoured fighting/reconnaissance vehicle (AFRV).

Design

Mobility
The AF-40-8-1 and AF-40-8-2 are similar in terms of 8-wheeled hull configuration, suspension, and transmission.  Internally, however, the vehicles differ in both engine type and engine placement. The AF-40-8-2's larger, 12-cylinder engine is mounted at the rear of the hull, where the AF-40-8-1's 10-cylinder engine is mounted at the front to allow for the troop compartment and rear troop ramp which is not present on or required for the AFRV version.

There is also an amphibious version of the Al Fahd available depending on customer requirements.  The hydraulic propellers are optional, so not all Al Fahd's are capable of an amphibious operation.

Protection
The vehicle also incorporates multiple layers of Kevlar internally to protect the crew and passengers against spall.

Armament
The armament for both the AF-40-8-1 and AF-40-8-2 varies according to customer specifications.  The AF-40-8-1 is capable of mounting anything up to and including a 40 mm cannon, and the AF-40-8-2 anything up to and including a low-recoil 105 mm cannon.

Operators

 
 
 : Pakistan Army.

References

Wheeled armoured fighting vehicles
Military equipment of Saudi Arabia
Military vehicles of Pakistan
Eight-wheeled vehicles
Military vehicles introduced in the 1990s
Wheeled amphibious armoured fighting vehicles
Wheeled armoured personnel carriers
Wheeled infantry fighting vehicles